The Little Brick Church, also known as Virginia's Chapel and William Tompkins Church, is a historic church that sits along US Route 60 in Cedar Grove, Kanawha County, West Virginia.  It was built in 1853, and is a small brick structure on a stone foundation.  The building was nearly square when built, but lengthened within a few years.  It features a louvered octagonal cupola, with finial. In 1912 a bell tower was added to the church.  A mural behind the pulpit was painted by Forrest Hull in the early 1900s. The Chapel was occupied during the American Civil War by both sides.  Originally a non-denominational chapel, it was for some time used exclusively by a Methodist congregation.

It was listed on the National Register of Historic Places in 1974.

References

External links

William Morris Chapter, Daughters of the American Revolution, Pratt, Kanawha County, West Virginia

American Civil War sites in West Virginia
Churches in Kanawha County, West Virginia
Kanawha County, West Virginia in the American Civil War
Methodist churches in West Virginia
National Register of Historic Places in Kanawha County, West Virginia
Churches on the National Register of Historic Places in Virginia
Churches completed in 1853